Muhammad Bobby Afif Nasution (born 5 July 1991) is an Indonesian businessman and politician who currently serves as the mayor of Medan. He is the son-in-law of President Joko Widodo.

Early life
Nasution was born on 5 July 1990 in Medan, North Sumatra, as the last of three siblings in a Batak family. His father Erwin Nasution had been the president director of state-owned plantations company PTPN IV. Nasution went to elementary school in Pontianak, West Kalimantan and middle and high schools in Bandar Lampung. He studied agribusiness for university, obtaining his bachelors and masters from the Bogor Agricultural Institute.

Career
In 2011, Nasution began working in the real estate industry, initially repairing homes and reselling them, then building some homes and being involved in larger projects. By 2016, he joined the real estate Takke Group as a marketing director through the introduction of his father. Outside of real estate, Nasution had briefly worked as a manager for the football club Medan Jaya in 2014.

While studying for his master's degree in Bogor, Nasution met Kahiyang Ayu, daughter of incumbent president Joko Widodo (Jokowi). They dated for around a year after they met in 2015, and the two married in November 2017, through a ceremony in Jokowi's hometown of Surakarta which was attended by some 7,000 live guests and watched by millions of people.

Nasution submitted a bid to run as a mayoral candidate for his hometown of Medan in the 2020 Indonesian local elections through Jokowi's political party PDI-P. This caused multiple observers to suggest that a political dynasty was being established, which Nasution denied. In ensuing months, he visited Gerindra chairman Prabowo Subianto and National Mandate Party chairman Zulkifli Hasan to gather support for his candidacy, in addition to registering with Golkar. He had officially become a cadre of PDI-P in March 2020. He was elected as Mayor of Medan in December 2020, after winning 54.5% of the votes and defeating incumbent mayor Akhyar Nasution.

References

1990 births
Living people
People from Medan
Indonesian Democratic Party of Struggle politicians
Bogor Agricultural University alumni
Joko Widodo
People of Batak descent
Mayors of Medan